Bond Hill is a neighborhood of the City of Cincinnati. Founded as a railroad suburb and temperance community in 1870 in northeastern Millcreek Township in Hamilton County, Ohio, it is one of a number of neighborhoods lining the Mill Creek, an urban stream in southwestern Ohio. The population was 7,002 at the 2020 census.

History
Bond Hill began as a commuter suburb connected to Cincinnati via the Marietta-Cincinnati Railroad. Bond Hill incorporated as the Village of Bond Hill in 1886  and the small village of about 1000 persons was annexed into Cincinnati in 1903. Many new homes were added east of the original settlement in the 1930s. Beginning in the 1960s, redlining by the Federal Housing Authority and blockbusting by Hamilton County realtors swiftly changed the demographic makeup of the community. The first black family moved to Bond Hill in 1964, but due to these practices, by 1978 nearly 70% of the community was black. By 2000, less than 7% of Bond Hill residents were white.

Bond Hill was founded by a cooperative building association, the Cooperative Land and Building Association No.1 of Hamilton County, Ohio, the first post-Civil War housing cooperative in Cincinnati and the first building association to be organized along idealistic and not ethnic lines. The cooperative was organized in 1870 by five men including several teetotallers from nearby Cumminsville. The cooperative initially planned on building in Cumminsville but for unknown reasons, the young co-op changed the site of their development to the area they renamed Bond Hill. The change was likely stimulated by a founding member of the cooperative, Henry Watkin. Watkin had been living in the area with his wife, Laura Ann Fry Watkin and their child, Effie Maud, since 1860. A utopian communalist and expatriat English printer, Watkin attained some renown as the adopted father and mentor of the once famous writer, Lafcadio Hearn. Henry Watkin's wife, Laura Ann Fry Watkin, was the daughter of the master artist, woodcarver, vegetarian, and religious communist Henry Fry. Early members of the cooperative included artist friends of Henry Fry: Emma Bepler and her father August Bepler.

For at least 11 years after its founding in 1870, the sale of liquor was prohibited in Bond Hill according to the Constitution and By-Laws of the Cooperative. In the early 1880s, a disagreement centered on Bond Hill's church, considered by some to be the cooperative's non-denominational church and by others to be Presbyterian, likely caused a schism within the early community and the cooperative. The role of Watkin and the early founders in the leadership of the community seems to have ebbed after this schism.

The origin of the name Bond Hill remains something of a mystery. Newspaper articles documenting the founding and naming of the railroad suburb by the cooperative indicate that Bond Hill was the name of the area in the 1830s: "This was the name of that particular locality forty years ago, and carries with it associations not easily forgotten by the oldest inhabitants," (January 10, 1871, Cincinnati Daily Enquirer). An oral history transcribed in 1961 by George E. Patmor, one of the village's earliest residents, indicates that the name was first given by visitors to a sawmill operated by a man named Bond: "In these days the people of St. Bernard and Cincinnati would use a footpath through the woods 'for a shortcut from St. Bernard to Bond’s sawmill to work or transact business.' It got to be a common saying that they were going up on Bond Hill, so this is how we got the name 'Bond Hill'." Local historian, Aharon Varady, speculates that like other mills in upper Millcreek Township, Bond's Mill may have been a gathering site for gambling and traveling teamsters—associations which nearby residents may have wished to be forgotten.

Until the mid-1930s, Bond Hill was largely rural and surrounded by orchards and dairy farms. New parkways, such as Bloody Run (later Victory) Parkway offered Cincinnatians a destination to picnic in Bond Hill meadows on weekends. Even earlier, while the Miami-Erie Canal still flowed to the west of the neighborhood, parties traveled up the canal towpath to recreation open spaces in an area called Ludlow Grove area between St. Bernard and Bond Hill. (Today, portions of Ludlow Grove exist as parks within developed portions of St. Bernard.) Residential developments replaced the dairy farms in the east of Bond Hill. Industrial facilities replaced the orchards in the south and the artificial lakes in the east. In the north, a regional high school and a large 4,400 car parking lot and shopping complex were built in the 1950s. Community residents opposed these intrusions but were largely ignored. Perhaps the most radical change in the neighborhood was the construction of the Interstate 75 Millcreek Expressway over the length of the canal in western Bond Hill and the Norwood Lateral (State Route 562) extension in southern Bond Hill. By their completion in the early 1960s the rural character of the neighborhood had been fundamentally altered.

The environmental degradation and urbanization of the neighborhood presaged the exit of whites from Bond Hill in the 1960s and '70s. Realtors and local banks actively encouraged the demographic transition of the neighborhood through redlining, blockbusting, and racial steering. The Bond Hill-Roselawn Community Council was founded in 1965 to combat this change. Throughout the next twenty years the Bond Hill Community Council struggled to develop a community plan and to stabilize white flight. Their achievements included the creation of a Bond Hill Community Master Plan in 1977 and the recognition of the "Old Bond Hill Village" Historic District in 1982. 

In 2016, the 1977 Community Master Plan was superseded by the publication of the Bond Hill + Roselawn Community Plan, created by the Bond Hill + Roselawn Collaborative, which replaced the Bond Hill-Community Council. The BH+R Community Plan was finalized  after two years of input from community volunteers and leaders, business owners, pastors and parishioners.

The Bond Hill Bella Vista Historic District
On October 16, 2019, The Cincinnati City Council unanimously voted to designate The Bond Hill Bella Vista Historic District the city's 25th historic district. The Bond Hill Bella Vista Historic District runs east of Reading Road, for the entirety of Bella Vista Street, which is a one-block, no outlet road with all underground utilities. The Bond Hill Bella Vista Historic District is Cincinnati's first predominantly Tudor Revival historic district as well as its first predominantly 1920s–1930s historic district.

References

External links
Bond Hill: Origin and Transformation of a 19th Century Cincinnati Railroad Suburb
Bond Hill online historical image archive
Bond Hill Historic District Guidelines
The Bond Hill Journal

Neighborhoods in Cincinnati
Populated places established in 1870
Former municipalities in Ohio
1870 establishments in Ohio